James (or Seamus) Lennon (26 August 1880 – 13 August 1958) was an Irish Sinn Féin politician who sat in the First Dáil. He would later become the founder of the far-right Irish Monetary Reform Association, a political organisation that obtained some strength in the midlands. Lennon's control of the organisation would be usurped by the young Oliver Flanagan, who eventually took control of the organisation from him.

Early life
Lennon was born in Cournellan, Borris, County Carlow.

Career
He was elected unopposed as a Sinn Féin MP for the Carlow constituency at the 1918 general election. In January 1919, Sinn Féin MPs refused to recognise the Parliament of the United Kingdom and instead assembled at the Mansion House in Dublin as a revolutionary parliament called Dáil Éireann, though Lennon did not attend as he was in prison.

He again elected unopposed for the Carlow–Kilkenny constituency at the 1921 elections. He opposed the Anglo-Irish Treaty and voted against it. He stood unsuccessfully as an anti-Treaty Sinn Féin candidate at the 1922 general election. Following this Lennon was arrested, tried and sentenced to five years in prison for his part in the robbery of a bank at Bagenalstown, Co. Carlow.

Still considering himself an Irish Republican in 1927, Lennon did not endorse Fianna Fáil in either of the two general elections that year as he believed they had reneged on certain core Republican principles. Nevertheless, Lennon offered them tacit support during the 1932 general election.

By 1933 Lennon began to publicly express anti-semitic views, voicing conspiracies that Jews controlled global banking and finance. This would lead Lennon to support Hitler and Nazism, with Lennon extolling Hitler for spreading the "truth" that Jews were responsible for all the poverty in the world.   

In 1938 Lennon would found the County Carlow Monetary and National Dividend Association, later to become the Irish Monetary Reform Association. "Monetary Reform" was the Irish terminology for the idea of Social Credit promoted by C. H. Douglas internationally (particularly in Canada). Additionally, the association and Lennon were influenced by Alfred O'Rahilly's book Money which argued for greater state control of commercial banks and the creation of a state bank to regulate credit. In 1941 Lennon was "responsible for the Irish National Monetary Reform Association issuing its historic constitution and manifesto". These documents were "influenced by and based on" the papal encyclicals Rerum novarum and Quadragesimo anno. Lennon and the IMRA sought to promote a fusion of Social Credit ideas with fundamentalist Catholicism and fascistic corporatism. When Alfred O'Rahilly became aware of Lennon's support of his ideas, O'Rahilly quickly distanced himself from Lennon and his extremist rhetoric. 

Although Lennon was the principal founder of the IMRA, Lennon was quickly outshone politically by the young Oliver Flanagan. While both Lennon and Flanagan were successful IMRA candidates in the 1942 Irish local elections, Flanagan achieved a meteoric rise by becoming a teachta dála in the 1944 general election. Even before the election, Flanagan's rise was a source of jealousy and infighting amongst the IRMA, which became split into pro-Lennon and pro-Flanagan camps. The in-fighting lead to no IRMA candidate running in the Carlow–Kilkenny constituency but fielding two in Laois–Offaly, where the pro-Lennon Henry Milner was beaten decisively by Flanagan.      

In 1947, he named in the Irish Press as the Irish Monetary Reform Association nominee for the Carlow–Kilkenny constituency at the 1948 general election for the party. However, he did not contest the election. A party colleague, William Milner, ran in the neighbouring Laois–Offaly constituency. By 1948 the IRMA had become utterly split between Lennon and Flanagan when Flanagan sought to support candidates from Clann na Talmhan for the Seanad. Lennon and the IMRA "National Executive" claimed it was previously agreed that the IMRA would not support any candidates for the Seanad and that Flanaghan was now in breach of their constitution and should be expelled. Although Flanaghan was indeed expelled for his actions, the bulk of the membership sided with Flanagan, and walked with him into a new, separate organisation called the "Irish Monetary Reform Party". With Flanagan and his supporters continuing to enjoy political success, the original IMRA withered and died away. 

By 1955 Lennon had rejoined Sinn Féin, and stood for them at the 1955 Irish local elections, to no success. Lennon died in Carlow on 13 August 1958.

Death 
Lennon died on 13 August 1958.

References

1880 births
1958 deaths
Antisemitism in Ireland
Early Sinn Féin TDs
Irish far-right politicians
Members of the 1st Dáil
Members of the 2nd Dáil
Members of the Parliament of the United Kingdom for County Carlow constituencies (1801–1922)
Politicians from County Carlow
UK MPs 1918–1922